Guisande is a former civil parish in the municipality of Santa Maria da Feira, Portugal. In 2013, the parish merged into the new parish Lobão, Gião, Louredo e Guisande. It has a population of 1,474 inhabitants and a total area of 3.78 km2.  Guisande is located approximately 30 km south of Porto and 320 km north from the capital city of Lisbon.

Sites of interests

Casa da Quintão (Outeiro) 
Casa do Loureiro (Barrosa) 
Casa do Moreira (Igreja) 
Casa Almeida (Cimo de Vila) 
Casa do Souto (Casaldaça) 
Casa Santiago (Quintães) 
Casa do Bacêlo (Fornos) 
Casa do Sr. Gomes (Reguengo) 
Cruzeiro (Igreja) 
Alminhas (Igreja, Cimo de Vila, Estôse, Casaldaça) 
Escola Primária do Viso

Localities

Igreja 
Quintães 
Viso 
Cimo de Vila 
Outeiro 
Estôse 
Pereirada 
Leira 
Gândara 
Casaldaça 
Lama 
Fornos 
Barrosa 
Reguengo

Associations

Guisande F.C. 
Associação Cultural de Guisande (literally the Guisande Cultural Association) "O Despertar"

References

Former parishes of Santa Maria da Feira